Vizma is a Latvian feminine given name. The associated name day is August 12.

Notable people named Vizma
Vizma Belševica (1931–2005), Latvian poet, writer and translator

References 

Latvian feminine given names
Feminine given names